Calosoma maderae is a species of ground beetle in the subfamily Carabinae which is  long. It was described by Johan Christian Fabricius in 1775 and is found in Europe, North Africa and Asia.

References

maderae
Beetles described in 1775
Taxa named by Johan Christian Fabricius
Beetles of North Africa
Beetles of Asia
Beetles of Europe